The name Delta has been used for one subtropical cyclone and for two tropical cyclones in the Atlantic Ocean:
 Subtropical Storm Delta (1972), formed and remained in the central Atlantic
 Tropical Storm Delta (2005), formed in the eastern Atlantic and became extratropical just before it passed to the north of the Canary Islands
 Hurricane Delta (2020), peaked as a powerful category 4 hurricane in the western Caribbean before making landfall as a category 2 hurricane in the Yucatán Peninsula and later in Louisiana

Atlantic hurricane set index articles